Binpur is a village in the Binpur I CD block in the Jhargram subdivision of the  Jhargram district in the state of West Bengal, India.

Geography

Location

Area overview
Jhargram subdivision, the only one in Jhargram district, shown in the map alongside, is composed of  hills, mounds and rolling lands. It is rather succinctly described in the District Human Development Report, 2011 (at that time it was part of Paschim Medinipur district), “The western boundary is more broken and picturesque, for the lower ranges of the Chhotanagpur Hills line the horizon, the jungle assumes the character of forest, and large trees begin to predominate. The soil, however, is lateritic, a considerable area is unproductive, almost uninhabited, especially in the extreme north-west where there are several hills over 1000 feet in height. The remainder of the country is an almost level plain broken only by the sand hills.” 3.48% of the population lives in urban areas and 96.52% lives in the rural areas. 20.11% of the total population belonged to scheduled castes and 29.37% belonged to scheduled tribes.

Note: The map alongside presents some of the notable locations in the subdivision. All places marked in the map are linked in the larger full screen map.

Demographics
As per 2011 Census of India Binpur had a total population of 1,842 of which 950 (52%) were males and 892 (48%) were females. Population below 6 years was 190. The total number of literates in Binpur was 1,402 (76.11% of the population over 6 years).

Civic administration

Police station
Binpur police station has jurisdiction over a part of Binpur II  CD Block.

Transport
State Highway 5 (West Bengal) running from Rupnarayanpur (in Bardhaman district) to Junput (in Purba Medinipur district) passes through Binpur.

Healthcare
Binpur Rural Hospital, with 30 beds at Binpur, is the major government medical facility in the Binpur I CD block.

References

Villages in Jhargram district